Nerang Street light rail station is situated on Nerang Street in the Gold Coast suburb of Southport. The station services the Southport Health precinct, with numerous medical and health facilities located nearby including the Pacific Private Day Hospital. Nerang Street station is a part of the Gold Coast's G:link light rail system.

Location 
Below is a map of the Gold Coast CBD precinct. The station can be identified by the grey marker.{
  "type": "FeatureCollection",
  "features": [
    {
      "type": "Feature",
      "properties": {},
      "geometry": {
        "type": "Point",
        "coordinates": [
          153.40847492159813,
          -27.970522013649994
        ]
      }
    }
  ]
}

References

External links 
 G:link

G:link stations
Railway stations in Australia opened in 2014
Southport, Queensland